Mazzoli is an Italian surname. Notable people with the surname include:

Missy Mazzoli (born 1980), American opera composer
Romano L. Mazzoli (1932–2022), American politician and lawyer
Athirson Mazolli e Oliveira (born 1977), Brazilian footballer

See also

Immigration Reform and Control Act of 1986 aka Simpson-Mazzoli Act
 Mazzuoli (disambiguation) 

Italian-language surnames